Centro Hospitalar may refer to:
 China
 Conde S. Januário Hospital (Centro Hospitalar Conde de São Januário) in Macau
 Portugal
 Centro Hospitalar Cova da Beira
 Centro Hospitalar Universitário de Lisboa Central
 Centro Hospitalar de Coimbra
  São Tomé and Príncipe
 Hospital Ayres de Menezes